David Lindsay was a Scottish footballer who played as a right winger.

Career 
Lindsay played club football for St Mirren, Hearts, West Ham United and Leith Athletic, and made one appearance for Scotland in 1903.

He missed a single game for West Ham United in 1906–07, his crosses from the right wing to players such as Harry Stapley, William Grassam and Lionel Watson contributing to the 60 goals scored by the club that season. In all, he made 2 FA Cup and 51 Southern Football League appearances for West Ham.

References 

Year of birth missing
Place of birth missing
Scottish footballers
Scotland international footballers
St Mirren F.C. players
Heart of Midlothian F.C. players
West Ham United F.C. players
Leith Athletic F.C. players
Southern Football League players
Association football wingers
Year of death missing
Place of death missing
Scottish Junior Football Association players
Scotland junior international footballers
Rutherglen Glencairn F.C. players
Scottish Football League players